Knowl Hill School is an independent school located in the village of Pirbright in Surrey. Knowl Hill is a co-educational (mixed gender) school. There is a Junior school with pupils from years 3 to year 8, and a Senior school with years 8 to 11. It is a relatively small school with up to 67 pupils. Speech and Language Therapy and Occupational Therapy is provided on site, and integrated into the lessons as well as being offered on a 1:1 basis. Teaching is multi-sensory in style and dyslexia friendly. Following the creation of an art block, the school also places some emphasis on the visual arts. Although the school is in Surrey, pupils come from different Local Educational Authorities, for example Kingston upon Thames, West Sussex and Hampshire.

History
Knowl Hill was founded in 1984. As well as standard classrooms, the school also provides a science lab and an art block with a photography studio. The school itself is small, as are the grounds within which the school is located. Because of this, certain activities or sports take place outside the school, for example tennis which takes place on public tennis courts within the village of Pirbright itself around a one-minute walk from the school.

Progression
Some pupils return to mainstream education before year 11, however, few continue to take GCSEs and BTECs. They then move on to embark on vocational courses.

External links
 http://www.knowlhillschool.org.uk/

Private schools in Surrey
Special schools in Surrey
Educational institutions established in 1984
1984 establishments in England